Californiconus californicus, common name the Californian cone, is a species of small, predatory sea snail, a marine gastropod mollusc in the family Conidae, the cone snails.

As both the Latin name and common name suggest, this cone is found in California.

Distribution and habitat 
This small cone snail is unusual, in that most cone snail species are tropical, whereas this species lives in the cooler, temperate waters of the eastern Pacific Ocean, including most of the coast of California. The range of this species is from the Farallon Islands near San Francisco to Bahia Magdalena, in Baja California, Mexico. 

This cone is found in both rocky and sandy areas, in the intertidal zone, and subtidally down to 30 meters depth.

Shell description
This shell is distinguished by its grayish-brown color and thick periostracum. It is round-shouldered with the aperture broader at the base. The spire is flat-sided, and the height of the shell ranges from 25–40 mm.

Feeding habits
The California cone hunts and eats marine worms, fish, and other mollusks. It is also a scavenger.

Gallery

Fossil record
Fossils of Californiconus californicus have been recovered from the Late Pleistocene strata of Isla Vista, California.

References

 Tucker J.K. & Tenorio M.J. (2009) Systematic classification of Recent and fossil conoidean gastropods. Hackenheim: Conchbooks. 296 pp.
 Puillandre N., Duda T.F., Meyer C., Olivera B.M. & Bouchet P. (2015). One, four or 100 genera? A new classification of the cone snails. Journal of Molluscan Studies. 81: 1–23

External links
Cone Shells – Knights of the Sea 
 

californicus
Gastropods described in 1844